She Smiles Because She Presses the Button is the third studio album by Trickfinger, the alias of musician John Frusciante, released on June 5, 2020 through Acid Test's Avenue 66 sub-label.

On April 16, the first two tracks were uploaded to the Acid Test bandcamp page for streaming and pre-order bonus.

Background
Like previous releases under the Trickfinger alias, Frusciante recorded She Smiles Because She Presses the Button in its entirety, without the involvement of any additional personnel. The fifth Trickfinger release, the album is a continuation of Frusciante's exploration of electronic music which had begun in 2007 after he "lost interest in traditional songwriting" shortly before leaving the Red Hot Chili Peppers for the second time, and comprised the bulk of his musical output during his decade away from the band.

She Smiles Because She Presses the Button was made available on vinyl, CD and as a digital download.  A second small run LP pressing was done soon after the release day as the initial pressing had run out.

Track listing

References

2020 albums
John Frusciante albums